Various Montana State Fairs have been held in different Montana locations:
Montana State Fairgrounds Racetrack, Helena, site of territorial and state fairs in Montana in the early 1900s
Montana ExpoPark, Great Falls, beginning in the 1930s and continuing to use the title “Montana State Fair” today
MetraPark, Billings, which hosts Montanafair, also called a “State Fair”